Assyriska IK, also known as Assyriska Turabdin IK, is a Swedish football club based in Jönköping. The club was formed in 2009 by Assyrian immigrants from the Tur Abdin region in Turkey, and is currently playing in Division 1 Södra which is the third tier of Swedish football. They play their home matches at Rosenlunds IP in Jönköping. Assyriska IK are affiliated to the Smålands Fotbollförbund.

See also
List of Assyrian-Syriac football teams in Sweden

References

External links
 Assyriska IK – official website
 Assyriska IK – official Twitter

Football clubs in Jönköping County
Assyrian football clubs
Assyrian/Syriac football clubs in Sweden
Association football clubs established in 2009
2009 establishments in Sweden
Diaspora sports clubs
Diaspora football clubs in Sweden